The 2019–20 UAE League Cup was the 12th season of the UAE League Cup. The season started on August 22, 2019.

Group stage

Group A

Group B

Group matches
All times are local (UTC+04:00)

Group A

Group B

Knockout stage

Quarter-finals

Semi-finals

Final

References

UAE League Cup seasons
2019–20 Asian domestic association football cups
2019–20 in Emirati football